Route 503, also known as Grenfell Drive, is a  north–south highway in the Labrador West region of southwestern Labrador. It connects Wabush with the Trans-Labrador Highway and the town of Labrador City.

Route description

Route 503 begins in Wabush's southern neighbourhoods at an intersection between Snow's Drive and Bowater Drive as a two-lane highway. It heads northwest through neighbourhoods before passing along the western side of downtown, where it temporarily widens to a four-lane divided highway. The highway now narrows back to two-lanes and passes north through wooded areas before passing by an industrial/business district and the Wabush Airport before Route 503 comes to an end at an intersection with Route 500 (Trans-Labrador Highway) near Labrador City.

Major intersections

References

503
Labrador
Labrador West